The Roman Catholic Diocese of Nova Friburgo is a diocese located in the city of Nova Friburgo in the Ecclesiastical province of Niterói in Brazil.

History
 March 26, 1960: Established as Diocese of Nova Friburgo from the Diocese of Barra do Piraí and Diocese of Petrópolis

Leadership
 Bishops of Nova Friburgo (Latin Church)
Clemente Isnard (23 Apr 1960  – 17 Jul 1992)
 Alano Maria Pena (24 Nov 1993  – 24 Sep 2003), appointed Archbishop of Niterói, Rio de Janeiro
 Rafael Llano Cifuentes (12 May 2004  – 20 Jan 2010)
 Edney Gouvea Mattoso (20 Jan 2010  – 22 Jan 2020); formerly an Auxiliary Bishop of the Roman Catholic Archdiocese of Sao Sebastiao do Rio de Janeiro, Brazil
Luiz Antônio Lopes Ricci (6 May 2020–present); formerly Auxiliary Bishop of the Archdiocese of Niteroi, Brazil.

References
 GCatholic.org
 Catholic Hierarchy
  Diocese website (Portuguese) 

Roman Catholic dioceses in Brazil
Christian organizations established in 1960
Nova Friburgo, Roman Catholic Diocese of
Roman Catholic dioceses and prelatures established in the 20th century
1960 establishments in Brazil